Syringopais is a moth genus. It is here placed in family Pterolonchidae, but its relationships are obscure and some authors instead ally it with the Gelechiidae, Autostichinae and/or Symmocidae and place it elsewhere in the Gelechioidea.

Species
Syringopais temperatella (Lederer, 1855)

References

Syringopainae
Moth genera